Payam Feili (پیام فیلی, born 1985) is an Iranian poet, activist and writer.

Biography
Payam Feili was born in 1985 in Kermanshah in Iran. He began to write in his early teen years. Feili published his first book – The Sun's Platform in 2005 at age of nineteen. The book was censored by the Ministry of Culture and Islamic Guidance. After that, Payam Feili's works have been banned from publication in Iran. His first novel – Tower and Pond as well as a collection of short essays Crimson Emptiness and Talking Waters were published by Lulu in the United States. The book was published in Persian. His second book – I Will Grow, I Will Bear Fruit . . . Figs was published in Germany by Gardoon Publishers. Other works including the novel Son of the Cloudy Years and a collection of poems Hasanak were published outside Iran. He is blacklisted in Iran not only because of his works, but also because he is openly gay. He lives in exile in Turkey.

At the end of 2015, Feili visited Israel as a guest of the Israeli Ministry of Culture. The visit was organized with help of culture and sport minister Miri Regev and interior minister Silvan Shalom, who issued a special permit, due to travel restrictions on the entry of Iranian citizens.

In 2016, Feili applied for asylum in Israel, which he described as an "interesting, beautiful and amazing" place. He says Israel is "not just another country. For me, it’s like a fairytale place." In March 2016, Feili's visa have been extended to allow him to stay while asylum request is being proceeded. However, after 3 years in Israel, he was still waiting for his asylum request and status in Israel to be officially confirmed.

Awards and recognition
 Poet of a month. The Missing Slate Magazine.

References

External links
Payam Feili blog
Payam Feili: Walking on Water
Paya Feili in Time

Iranian male poets
Iranian activists
Iranian LGBT poets
Iranian LGBT novelists
Gay poets
1985 births
Living people
Iranian exiles
Iranian expatriates in Turkey
Iranian male novelists
Gay novelists
Iranian emigrants to Israel